Myung-sook, also spelled Myeong-sook or Myong-suk, is a Korean feminine given name. Its meaning differs based on the hanja used to write each syllable of the name. There are 19 hanja with the reading "myung" and 13 hanja with the reading "sook" on the South Korean government's official list of hanja which may be registered for use in given names. Myung-sook was the fifth-most popular name for newborn girls in South Korea in 1950.

People with this name include:
Han Myeong-sook (born 1944), South Korea's first female prime minister 
Kim Myong-suk (born 1947), North Korean volleyball player
Paek Myong-suk (born 1954), North Korean volleyball player
Kimshin Myongsuk (born 1961), South Korean feminist activist
Jong Myong-suk (born 1993), North Korean wrestler

Fictional characters with this name include:
Myung-sook, character portrayed by Bang Eun-hee in 2004–2005 South Korean television series Precious Family

See also
List of Korean given names

References

Korean feminine given names